Michael Kevin Guymon (born September 17, 1974) is a retired American professional mixed martial artist who formerly competed in Bellator's Lightweight division. He has also competed for the UFC, as an alternate for the Tucson Scorpions in the IFL, BAMMA, and King of the Cage. He is the former King of the Cage Welterweight Champion.

Michael was featured in the movie documentary "The Hurt Business" that debuted September 29th 2016 playing himself.

Background
Guymon was born in Newport Beach, CA but raised in Irvine, CA. He attended many different schools but graduated from Woodbridge High School and went to Orange Coast College to further his studies. Guymon was trying to live his dream of playing professional baseball but while doing that he stumbled into mixed martial arts and instantly fell in love with the sport. He began training Muay Thai and kickboxing soon after finding out about the new combat sport. Once Guymon noticed that to become successful in MMA he would need to start developing a ground game, he started taking classes on Brazilian jiu-jitsu and wrestling.

Mixed martial arts career

In 1999, Guymon had his first professional fight against Zach Turnage with the fight resulting in a draw after fighting in three five-minute rounds and a five-minute overtime. He won two straight before opening the eyes of the matchmaker for the King of the Cage promotion who offered him a fight against up and comer, Diego Sanchez. Guymon took the fight and lost by armbar submission with three seconds left in the first round.

Guymon's next four fights came inside the King of the Cage promotion all wins and all of them coming by submission in the first round. With the four wins he improved his overall record to 6-1-1 getting him signed to the IFL. He made his debut taking on Pat Healy losing via a split decision. Guymon then returned to King of the Cage and won five straight fights, the last one being for the King of the Cage Welterweight Championship just three weeks after his suicide attempt.

Ultimate Fighting Championship
Four days after defending the King of the Cage Welterweight Championship against Quinn Mulhern, Guymon received a call from the UFC about signing a contract. Guymon accepted and signed onto a four-fight deal.

He lost his UFC debut on January 11, 2010 in Fairfax, Virginia at UFC Fight Night 20 against 20-year-old Canadian, Rory MacDonald. The fight stayed standing for the most part but ended when Rory took the fight to the ground and submission submitted Guymon with an armbar near the end of the first round.

Guymon defeated Yoshiyuki Yoshida on May 8, 2010 at UFC 113 by unanimous decision.

Guymon faced Daniel Roberts on October 23, 2010 at UFC 121. Guymon would go on to lose the fight after Roberts locked on an anaconda choke, following with a gator roll that tightened the squeeze forcing Guymon to tap.

Guymon next faced DaMarques Johnson on January 22, 2011 at UFC Fight Night 23 where he was injured early into the fight. He lost via verbal submission in the first round. After the fight, due to rupturing two discs in his back, Guymon announced his retirement from MMA.

Post-UFC
Guymon came out of retirement on March 16, 2012 dropping down to the Lightweight division where he defeated Chris Leyva by TKO due to punches in the second round at BAMMA USA: Badbeat 5. In his second fight at Lightweight in Bamma USA he beat Mike Dizack by split decision. 

Guymon faced Savant Young at Bellator 85. He suffered the first knockout loss of his career after a left hook from Young put Guymon out cold, just under a minute into the second round. After the fight, Guymon was taken to the hospital, where the doctor noticed he had fracture of the orbital, cheekbone and jaw. The doctor advised Guymon to never compete again in any combat sport.

Days after his first Bellator win against Aaron Miller on November 2, 2013, Guymon announced his retirement from MMA for the second time.

Personal life
Mike Guymon is currently married to Nicole Guymon.

Suicide attempt
On August 11, 2009, Guymon attempted to commit suicide after a dispute with his wife about possibly divorcing. Guymon wrote his family a suicide note and had planned to shoot himself with a handgun, but before he could do so, his wife was able to wrestle the gun away. Guymon then got into his truck and drove away but was stopped a few blocks away by the Orange County Sheriffs Department. Guymon tried numerous times to get the deputies to shoot and kill him but all refused. The deputies were able to calm Guymon down and get him some help.

Mixed martial arts record

|-
| Win
| align=center| 15–6–1
| Aaron Miller
| Submission (triangle choke)
| Bellator 106
| 
| align=center| 2
| align=center| 4:20
| Long Beach, California, United States
| 
|-
| Loss
| align=center| 14–6–1
| Savant Young
| KO (punch)
| Bellator 85
| 
| align=center| 2
| align=center| 0:48
| Irvine, California, United States
| 
|-
| Win
| align=center| 14–5–1
| Mike Dizak
| Decision (unanimous)
| BAMMA USA: Badbeat 6
| 
| align=center| 3
| align=center| 5:00
| Commerce, California, United States
| 
|-
| Win
| align=center| 13–5–1
| Cris Leyva
| TKO (punches)
| BAMMA USA: Badbeat 5
| 
| align=center| 2
| align=center| 4:10
| Commerce, California, United States
| 
|-
| Loss
| align=center| 12–5–1
| DaMarques Johnson
| Submission (body triangle)
| UFC: Fight for the Troops 2
| 
| align=center| 1
| align=center| 3:22
| Killeen, Texas, United States
| 
|-
| Loss
| align=center| 12–4–1
| Daniel Roberts
| Submission (anaconda choke)
| UFC 121
| 
| align=center| 1
| align=center| 1:13
| Anaheim, California, United States
| 
|-
| Win
| align=center| 12–3–1
| Yoshiyuki Yoshida
| Decision (unanimous)
| UFC 113
| 
| align=center| 3
| align=center| 5:00
| Montreal, Quebec, Canada
| 
|-
| Loss
| align=center| 11–3–1
| Rory MacDonald
| Submission (armbar)
| UFC Fight Night: Maynard vs. Diaz
| 
| align=center| 1
| align=center| 4:27
| Fairfax, Virginia, United States
| 
|-
| Win
| align=center| 11–2–1
| Quinn Mulhern
| TKO (submission to punch)
| KOTC: Distorted
| 
| align=center| 4
| align=center| 4:32
| Highland, California, United States
| 
|-
| Win
| align=center| 10–2–1
| Kyacey Uscola
| TKO (punches)
| KOTC: Militia
| 
| align=center| 2
| align=center| 1:12
| Highland, California, United States
| 
|-
| Win
| align=center| 9–2–1
| Anthony Lapsley
| Submission (arm-triangle choke)
| KOTC: Prowler
| 
| align=center| 5
| align=center| 3:37
| Highland, California, United States
| 
|-
| Win
| align=center| 8–2–1
| James Fanshier
| TKO (punches)
| KOTC: Bio Hazard
| 
| align=center| 1
| align=center| 2:54
| Highland, California, United States
| 
|-
| Win
| align=center| 7–2–1
| Chris Moore
| TKO (punch)
| KOTC: Fight Nite @ The Shrine
| 
| align=center| 2
| align=center| 1:52
| Los Angeles, California, United States
| 
|-
| Loss
| align=center| 6–2–1
| Pat Healy
| Decision (split)
| IFL: Las Vegas
| 
| align=center| 3
| align=center| 4:00
| Las Vegas, Nevada, United States
| 
|-
| Win
| align=center| 6–1–1
| Josh Ramage
| Submission (triangle choke)
| KOTC: Destroyer
| 
| align=center| 1
| align=center| 1:52
| San Jacinto, California, United States
| 
|-
| Win
| align=center| 5–1–1
| Ken Cadoy
| Submission (guillotine choke)
| KOTC 63: Final Conflict
| 
| align=center| 1
| align-center|N/A
| San Jacinto, California, United States
| 
|-
| Win
| align=center| 4–1–1
| Ray Perales
| Submission (triangle choke)
| KOTC 58: Prime Time
| 
| align=center| 1
| align=center| 4:02
| San Jacinto, California, United States
| 
|-
| Win
| align=center| 3–1–1
| Joe Frainee
| TKO (submission to punches)
| KOTC 41: Relentless
| 
| align=center| 1
| align=center| 2:22
| San Jacinto, California, United States
| 
|-
| Loss
| align=center| 2–1–1
| Diego Sanchez
| Submission (armbar)
| KOTC 23: Sin City
| 
| align=center| 1
| align=center| 4:57
| Las Vegas, Nevada, United States
| 
|-
| Win
| align=center| 2–0–1
| Thomas Schulte
| Submission (armbar)
| Ultimate Athlete 3: Vengeance
| 
| align=center| 1
| align=center| 3:51
| Denver, Colorado, United States
| 
|-
| Win
| align=center| 1–0–1
| Eric Duus
| TKO (punches)
| Ultimate Athlete 2: The Gathering
| 
| align=center| 1
| align=center| 4:32
| Cabazon, California, United States
| 
|-
| Draw
| align=center| 0–0–1
| Zach Turnage
| Draw
| Kage Kombat 15
| 
| align=center| 1
| align=center| 10:00
| Los Angeles, California, United States
|

References

External links
 
 

American male mixed martial artists
Welterweight mixed martial artists
Mixed martial artists utilizing Muay Thai
Mixed martial artists utilizing wrestling
Mixed martial artists utilizing Brazilian jiu-jitsu
1974 births
Living people
Mixed martial artists from California
Sportspeople from Newport Beach, California
People from Irvine, California
Ultimate Fighting Championship male fighters
American Muay Thai practitioners
American practitioners of Brazilian jiu-jitsu